Delhi Township is a township in Delaware County, Iowa, USA.  As of the 2000 census, its population was 1,047.

Geography
Delhi Township covers an area of 35.93 square miles (93.07 square kilometers); of this, 0.28 square miles (0.72 square kilometers) or 0.77 percent is water. The stream of Allison Creek runs through this township.

Cities and towns
 Delaware (southeast quarter)
 Delhi

Adjacent townships
 Oneida Township (north)
 Bremen Township (northeast)
 North Fork Township (east)
 South Fork Township (southeast)
 Union Township (south)
 Hazel Green Township (southwest)
 Milo Township (west)

Cemeteries
The township contains four cemeteries: Allison, Evergreen, Plum Creek and Saint Johns.

Major highways
 U.S. Route 20

References
 U.S. Board on Geographic Names (GNIS)
 United States Census Bureau cartographic boundary files

External links
 US-Counties.com
 City-Data.com

Townships in Delaware County, Iowa
Townships in Iowa